The Pacific View League (PVL) is a high school athletic conference in California affiliated with the CIF Southern Section. The league was formed in 1998, pulling Camarillo and Channel Islands high schools from the Marmonte League to join Hueneme, Oxnard, and Rio Mesa highs from the Channel League. Pacifica High School joined the league when it opened its doors in 2001.

For most of its history, the PVL consisted entirely of schools from the Oxnard Union High School District, including the five charter members (Camarillo, Channel Islands, Hueneme, Oxnard, and Rio Mesa). As of the 2018–19 school year, all member schools are located in or near Oxnard and Ventura in Ventura County, California.

Member schools
Buena High School (2018–present)
Oxnard High School (1998–present)
Pacifica High School (2001–present)
Rio Mesa High School (1998–present)
Ventura High School (2018–present)

Former members
Adolfo Camarillo High School (1998–2014; joined Coastal Canyon League)
Cate School (girls' water polo only)
Channel Islands High School (1998–2022; joined Citrus Coast League in all sports except football)
Hueneme High School (1998–2018; joined Citrus Coast League)

Football association with Channel League
In April 2019, during the biennial releaguing process in the Northern Area of the CIF Southern Section, administrators from member schools approved a proposal to create an association with the Channel League in the sport of football only. The association, composed of the 12 schools from the two leagues combined, assigns each school to one of the leagues, with promotion and relegation taking place every two years. The plan was originally scheduled to begin for the 2020–21 academic year. However, the COVID-19 pandemic has delayed its implementation, as the 2020 football season was postponed and shortened; upon the return of sports in early 2021, health officials in Ventura County prohibited schools there from playing teams in adjacent counties (this restriction was later lifted). In May 2021, another round of realignment saw the merging of the Pacific View League with the Channel League, beginning with the 2022–23 academic year.

Sports
The Pacific View League sponsors the following sports:

Fall season
Football (11-man)
Cross country
Girls' volleyball
Girls' tennis
Boys' water polo
Girls' golf

Winter season
Basketball
Soccer
Girls' water polo
Wrestling

Spring season
Baseball
Boys' golf
Softball
Swimming and diving
Boys' tennis
Track and field
Boys' volleyball

Notes

References

CIF Southern Section leagues
Sports in Ventura County, California